Alain Stanké (né Aloyzas-Vytas Stankevicius),  (born June 11, 1934) is a Canadian francophone television and radio host and commentator, writer, editor, producer, interviewer and journalist. Born in Kaunas (Lithuania), he immigrated to Montreal in 1951.

Honours
In 1998, he was made a Member of the Order of Canada in recognition for being a "multi-talented individual, who has both entertained and challenged us throughout his career". In 2003, he was made a Knight of the National Order of Quebec.

References

External links
 Official site (In French)
 Alain Stanké fonds (R15713) at Library and Archives Canada

1934 births
Living people
Lithuanian emigrants to Canada
Knights of the National Order of Quebec
Members of the Order of Canada
Journalists from Quebec
Writers from Quebec